Maurice Washington (born July 25, 1956) was a Republican member of the Nevada Senate, representing Washoe County District 2 (map).

Maurice Washington is a candidate for Washoe County Commission, District 4.

External links
Nevada State Legislature - Senator Maurice E. Washington official government website
Project Vote Smart - Senator Maurice E. Washington (NV) profile
Follow the Money - Maurice Washington
2006 2004 2002 20001998 1994 campaign contributions

Republican Party members of the Nevada Assembly
Republican Party Nevada state senators
1956 births
Living people
Politicians from Albuquerque, New Mexico